VPF can refer to:
 Vascular permeability factor, an alternate name for the protein vascular endothelial growth factor (VEGF)
 Vector Product Format
 Vietnam Football Federation (Vietnam Professional Football Jointstock Company)
 Virtual Print Fee